Portsmouth Public Library may refer to:

Portsmouth Public Library (Ohio), United States
Portsmouth Public Library (New Hampshire), United States